George Herron may refer to:

 George D. Herron (1862–1925), American clergyman, writer and Christian socialist activist
 George Richard Herron (1888–1967), New Zealand politician of the National Party

See also
 George Heron (disambiguation)